The Lord Howe fantail (Rhipidura fuliginosa cervina), also known as the Lord Howe Island fantail or fawn-breasted fantail, was a small bird in the fantail family, Rhipiduridae.  It is an extinct subspecies of the New Zealand fantail (Rhipidura fuliginosa).  It was endemic to Lord Howe Island in the Tasman Sea, part of New South Wales, Australia.

Description
 
The Lord Howe fantail has sometimes been treated as a full species.  It differed from the other subspecies by its entire underparts being light cinnamon-brown, with a paler throat, lacking the white throat with the dark bar delimiting it from the breast.

Distribution and habitat
The Lord Howe fantail was restricted to Lord Howe Island, where it inhabited the native subtropical rainforest.

Behaviour
The birds were very tame, commonly seen around buildings which they often entered in search of insects.

Breeding
The fantail built a cup-shaped nest, with a rudimentary tail, of decayed wood fibre and grass, bound with cobwebs and lined with fine grass, situated on a horizontal branch.  The clutch was usually three, sometimes two, eggs.

Extinction
The Lord Howe fantail was reported as common in 1909 but disappeared not long after black rats were accidentally introduced to the island with the grounding of the ship SS Makambo there in June 1918.  It was reported in 1924 that the birds were "practically wiped out" and there are no records from subsequent years.  The fantail was only one of a suite of Lord Howe's endemic birds and other fauna exterminated by rat predation.

Notes

References
 Garnett, Stephen T.; & Crowley, Gabriel M. (2000). The Action Plan for Australian Birds 2000. Environment Australia: Canberra. 
 Hindwood, K.A. (1940). Birds of Lord Howe Island. Emu 40: 1-86.
 Schodde, R.; & Mason, I.J. (1999). The Directory of Australian Birds: Passerines. CSIRO Publishing: Melbourne. 

Lord Howe fantail
Extinct birds of Lord Howe Island
Bird extinctions since 1500
Lord Howe fantail